Valjoux (for Vallée de Joux, "Joux Valley") is a Swiss manufacturer of mechanical watch movements. It is known primarily for chronograph ébauche movements that are used in a number of mid- to high-range mechanical watches. The company is a part of ETA, and is a member of the Swatch Group. They are also the movement providers for early Rolex Daytonas such as 6263.

Valjoux 7750 
Valjoux is responsible for the design and manufacture of the Valjoux 7750 movement (and variants), an extremely popular movement used in many mechanical chronograph watches.

The Valjoux 7750 is different from most other chronograph movements, using the three-plane cam system rather than the column wheel. It is constructed of a mainplate, calendar plate, and chronograph top plate. Levers push a cam back and forth, driving the stopwatch mechanism of the Valjoux 7750. This is referred to as a coulisse-lever escapement. In the 1980s, many companies began using the Valjoux 7750 because it was easier to mass-produce and distribute in high volume. The Valjoux 7750 can be created in several different displays, including adding or eliminating a date window or adding or subtracting a subdial. Watch companies can purchase the movement and alter it in house if they desire.

Some watch brands that use base movements manufactured by Valjoux include Appella, Breitling, Christopher Ward, Cyma Watches, Deep Blue Watches, Dreyfuss & Co., Fortis, Gallet, Glycine, Hamilton Watch, IWC, Steinhart, Invicta Watch Group, Junghans, Longines, Louis Erard, Mido, NIXON Inc., Omega, Oris, Panerai, Porsche Design, Sector No Limits, Sinn, TAG Heuer, Tissot, Tutima, Xezo, and Zodiac Watches.

There are also a large number of derivative chronograph movements based on the Valjoux 7750 base. These include ETA's own Valgranges, designed for larger watches, as well as the following third-party movements:
 Alfred Rochat for Chronoswiss (C. 732 or C. 741, C 741 by Rochat)
 Dreyfuss & Co. (Have a range of 7750 Valjoux watches)
 Fortis (developed by Paul Gerber featuring an alarm and two springs)
 Franck Muller (for example FM 7850 CC MB)
 Hamilton (for example H31)
 IWC
 Selectus
 Jacques Etoile (cal. IV.C4)
 La Joux-Perret/Jacquet (for Jaquet Droz, Bremont BE-83, and others)
 Maurice Lacroix ML112
 Paul Picot ("Atelier Technikum")
 Panerai
 Porsche Design (Eterna 6036)
 Revue-Thommen ("Airspeed Flyback")
 Sellita SW500
 Sinn ("Flyback")
 Soprod
 Damasko (fitting a silicon main spring to the 7750)

References

Further reading 
 Odets, Walt, "The Valjoux 7750 chronograph", timezone.com.
 Braun, Peter; Mook, Andreas, "Special: Caliber Corner Chronographs: The Valjoux Engine"

External links 
 Valjoux Reference Site Excellent source for company history, watch details, etc.
 "Valjoux Watch Movements", ofrei.com, Otto Frei
 Alliance Horlogere A page containing information about the Valjoux 7750 along with a video showing the mechanism being assembled
  Crown & Caliber

Watch movement manufacturers
The Swatch Group
Manufacturing companies of Switzerland